"Human Genetic Diversity: Lewontin's Fallacy" is a 2003 paper by A. W. F. Edwards. He criticises an argument first made in Richard Lewontin's 1972 article "The Apportionment of Human Diversity", that the practice of dividing humanity into races is taxonomically invalid because any given individual will often have more in common genetically with members of other population groups than with members of their own. Edwards argued that this does not refute the biological reality of race since genetic analysis can usually make correct inferences about the perceived race of a person from whom a sample is taken, and that the rate of success increases when more genetic loci are examined.

Edwards' paper was reprinted, commented upon by experts such as Noah Rosenberg, and given further context in an interview with philosopher of science Rasmus Grønfeldt Winther in a 2018 anthology. Edwards' critique is discussed in a number of academic and popular science books, with varying degrees of support.

Some scholars, including Winther and Jonathan Marks, dispute the premise of "Lewontin's fallacy", arguing that Edwards' critique does not actually contradict Lewontin's argument. A 2007 paper in Genetics by David J. Witherspoon et al. concluded that the two arguments are in fact compatible, and that Lewontin's observation about the distribution of genetic differences across ancestral population groups applies "even when the most distinct populations are considered and hundreds of loci are used".

Lewontin's argument
In the 1972 study "The Apportionment of Human Diversity", Richard Lewontin performed a fixation index (FST) statistical analysis using 17 markers, including blood group proteins, from individuals across classically defined "races" (Caucasian, African, Mongoloid, South Asian Aborigines, Amerinds, Oceanians, and Australian Aborigines). He found that the majority of the total genetic variation between humans (i.e., of the 0.1% of DNA that varies between individuals), 85.4%, is found within populations, 8.3% of the variation is found between populations within a "race", and only 6.3% was found to account for the racial classification. Numerous later studies have confirmed his findings. Based on this analysis, Lewontin concluded, "Since such racial classification is now seen to be of virtually no genetic or taxonomic significance either, no justification can be offered for its continuance."

This argument has been cited as evidence that racial categories are biologically meaningless, and that behavioral differences between groups are not caused by genetic differences. One example is the "Statement on 'Race'" published by the American Anthropological Association in 1998, which rejected the existence of races as unambiguous, clearly demarcated, biologically distinct groups.

Edwards' critique

Edwards argued that while Lewontin's statements on variability are correct when examining the frequency of different alleles (variants of a particular gene) at an individual locus (the location of a particular gene) between individuals, it is nonetheless possible to classify individuals into different racial groups with an accuracy that approaches 100 percent when one takes into account the frequency of the alleles at several loci at the same time. This happens because differences in the frequency of alleles at different loci are correlated across populations—the alleles that are more frequent in a population at two or more loci are correlated when we consider the two populations simultaneously. Or in other words, the frequency of the alleles tends to cluster differently for different populations.

In Edwards' words, "most of the information that distinguishes populations is hidden in the correlation structure of the data". These relationships can be extracted using commonly used ordination and cluster analysis techniques. Edwards argued that, even if the probability of misclassifying an individual based on the frequency of alleles at a single locus is as high as 30% (as Lewontin reported in 1972), the misclassification probability becomes close to zero if enough loci are studied.

Edwards' paper stated that the underlying logic was discussed in the early years of the 20th century. Edwards wrote that he and Luigi Luca Cavalli-Sforza had presented a contrasting analysis to Lewontin's, using very similar data, already at the 1963 International Congress of Genetics. Lewontin participated in the conference but did not refer to this in his later paper. Edwards argued that Lewontin used his analysis to attack human classification in science for social reasons.

Support and criticism

Evolutionary biologist Richard Dawkins discusses genetic variation across human races in his book The Ancestor's Tale.  In the chapter "The Grasshopper's Tale", he characterizes the genetic variation between races as a very small fraction of the total human genetic variation, but he disagrees with Lewontin's conclusions about taxonomy, writing: "However small the racial partition of the total variation may be, if such racial characteristics as there are highly correlate with other racial characteristics, they are by definition informative, and therefore of taxonomic significance." Neven Sesardić has argued that, unbeknownst to Edwards, Jeffry B. Mitton had already made the same argument about Lewontin's claim in two articles published in The American Naturalist in the late 1970s.

Biological anthropologist Jonathan M. Marks agrees with Edwards that correlations between geographical areas and genetics obviously exist in human populations but goes on to write: What is unclear is what this has to do with 'race' as that term has been used through much in the twentieth century—the mere fact that we can find groups to be different and can reliably allot people to them is trivial. Again, the point of the theory of race was to discover large clusters of people that are principally homogeneous within and heterogeneous between, contrasting groups. Lewontin's analysis shows that such groups do not exist in the human species, and Edwards' critique does not contradict that interpretation. The view that while geographic clustering of biological traits does exist, this does not lend biological validity to racial groups, was proposed by several evolutionary anthropologists and geneticists prior to the publication of Edwards' critique of Lewontin.

In the 2007 paper "Genetic Similarities Within and Between Human Populations", Witherspoon et al. attempt to answer the question "How often is a pair of individuals from one population genetically more dissimilar than two individuals chosen from two different populations?" The answer depends on the number of polymorphisms used to define that dissimilarity, and the populations being compared. When they analysed three geographically distinct populations (European, African, and East Asian) and measured genetic similarity over many thousands of loci, the answer to their question was "never"; however, measuring similarity using smaller numbers of loci yielded substantial overlap between these populations. Rates of between-population similarity also increased when geographically intermediate and admixed populations were included in the analysis.

Witherspoon et al. write: Since an individual's geographic ancestry can often be inferred from his or her genetic makeup, knowledge of one's population of origin should allow some inferences about individual genotypes. To the extent that phenotypically important genetic variation resembles the variation studied here, we may extrapolate from genotypic to phenotypic patterns. ... However, the typical frequencies of alleles responsible for common complex diseases remain unknown.  The fact that, given enough genetic data, individuals can be correctly assigned to their populations of origin is compatible with the observation that most human genetic variation is found within populations, not between them. It is also compatible with our finding that, even when the most distinct populations are considered and hundreds of loci are used, individuals are frequently more similar to members of other populations than to members of their own population. Thus, caution should be used when using geographic or genetic ancestry to make inferences about individual phenotypes.  Witherspoon et al. add: "A final complication arises when racial classifications are used as proxies for geographic ancestry. Although many concepts of race are correlated with geographic ancestry, the two are not interchangeable, and relying on racial classifications will reduce predictive power still further."

In a 2014 paper, reprinted in the 2018 Edwards Cambridge University Press volume, Rasmus Grønfeldt Winther argues that "Lewontin's fallacy" is effectively a misnomer, as there really are two different sets of methods and questions at play in studying the genomic population structure of our species: "variance partitioning" and "clustering analysis". According to Winther, they are "two sides of the same mathematics coin" and neither "necessarily implies anything about the reality of human groups".

See also
 Race and genetics
 Population groups in biomedicine

References

Biology papers
Human population genetics
Race (human categorization)
Biology controversies
Taxonomy (biology)